Pillar of Mist is a 1987 South Korean film directed by Park Chul-soo. It was chosen as Best Film at the Grand Bell Awards.

Plot
The film is a drama about a married couple.

Cast
Choi Myung-gil as "I"
Lee Young-ha as "Him"
Park Jung-ja as "Her"
Seo Kap-sook as "Her"
O Seung-myeong as "Him"
Im Yeong-hui as "Her"
Lee Jeong-mi as "Child"
Sim Jae-won as "Child"
Choe Hyeong-seon as "Child"
Han Chang-ho as "Child"

Bibliography

References

1980s Korean-language films
Best Picture Grand Bell Award winners
Films directed by Park Chul-soo
South Korean drama films